Rowan (also Romanized as Row‘ān; also known as Rawān and Ro‘ān) is a village in Sabzdasht Rural District, in the Central District of Kabudarahang County, Hamadan Province, Iran. At the 2006 census, its population was 2,059, in 488 families.

References 

Populated places in Kabudarahang County

Rawan is a girl's name and it means a river in paradise